Sant'Ansano is a neoclassical-style, Roman Catholic church located in the town of Spoleto, in the province of Perugia, region of Umbria, Italy.

History
A church at the site had been built around the tomb of St Isaac, a Syrian eremitic monk who supposedly came to a mountain around Spoleto in the 6th century. The present church was built in the late 1700s by the Milanese architect Antonio Dotti.

Inside are housed a fresco depicting the Madonna and Child and two Saints by Giovanni di Pietro, also called Lo Spagna and a main altarpiece depicting the Martyrdom of St Ansano by Archita Ricci.  

The Crypt of Sant'Isacco below the church was likely previously a ground-level, ancient Roman temple, upon which a church was built above. St Isaac of Monteluco was putatively a fifth century Syrian hermit, who established a community of hermit-monks in nearby Monteluco. The crypt has romanesque-style, sculpted capitals (8-9th century) atop ancient roman columns. It may infact have been an original ground level pagan Roman temple. It also has some 11th-12th-century restored frescoes.

References

Churches in Spoleto
Neoclassical architecture in Umbria
Romanesque architecture in Spoleto
18th-century Roman Catholic church buildings in Italy
Octagonal churches in Italy
Neoclassical church buildings in Italy